Changkuoth Jiath (born 13 June 1999) is an Australian rules footballer who plays for the Hawthorn Football Club in the Australian Football League (AFL).

Early life
Born in Ethiopia to South Sudanese parents, Jiath moved to Australia when he was six years old. Living in the town of Morwell he played his junior football at the Morwell Youth Club. Changkuoth then went on to play senior football at the Morwell Tigers Football Club. Due to his name being quite hard for others to pronounce Jiath adopted the nickname "CJ" to make it easier for people to address him. He completed high school while boarding at Xavier College in Melbourne.

AFL Career

Known as CJ, Jiath was selected as a 2017 category B rookie. He had a delayed start to the 2018 season when he suffered a groin injury during the pre-season. Jiath made his debut for Box Hill mid year he showed good signs on the half back line. Jiath made his debut for Hawthorn in the snow for their round 21, 2019 game against  . He ended up playing 2 games during the 2019 season. In the middle of the 2020 season, Jiath was upgraded to the senior list following changes to the rookie promotion rules.

The 2021 season ended up being a breakout year for Jiath as he grew with skill and confidence. Nearly averaging 20+ disposals for all 16 games he played in. Jiath's season was cut short due to a PCL injury which ruled him out for the remainder of the season.

Statistics
Updated to the end of the 2022 season.

|-
| 2018 ||  || 43
| 0 || — || — || — || — || — || — || — || — || — || — || — || — || — || — || 0
|-
| 2019 ||  || 29
| 2 || 0 || 0 || 10 || 19 || 29 || 7 || 5 || 0.0 || 0.0 || 5.0 || 9.5 || 14.5 || 3.5 || 2.5 || 0
|-
| 2020 ||  || 29
| 5 || 0 || 0 || 27 || 21 || 48 || 13 || 8 || 0.0 || 0.0 || 5.4 || 4.2 || 9.6 || 2.6 || 1.6 || 0
|-
| 2021 ||  || 29
| 16 || 0 || 2 || 172 || 152 || 324 || 93 || 26 || 0.0 || 0.1 || 10.8 || 9.5 || 20.3 || 5.8 || 1.6 || 2
|-
| 2022 ||  || 9
| 15 || 1 || 2 || 141 || 113 || 254 || 63 || 29 || 0.1 || 0.1 || 10.1 || 8.1 || 18.1 || 4.5 || 2.1 || 6
|- class="sortbottom"
! colspan=3| Career
! 37 !! 1 !! 4 !! 350 !! 305 !! 655 !! 176 !! 68 !! 0.0 !! 0.1 !! 9.5 !! 8.2 !! 17.7 !! 4.8 !! 1.8 !! 8
|}

Notes

Honours and achievements
Team
 VFL premiership player: 2018

Individual
 22 Under 22 team: 2021
  most promising player: 2021

References

External links

 
 

1999 births
Living people
Morwell Football Club players
Box Hill Football Club players
Hawthorn Football Club players
Australian rules footballers from Victoria (Australia)
Australian people of South Sudanese descent
Sportspeople of South Sudanese descent
Sudanese emigrants to Australia
People educated at Xavier College
South Sudanese players of Australian rules football
South Sudanese refugees
Refugees in Ethiopia
People from Morwell, Victoria